Sulina is a town and free port in Tulcea County, Northern Dobruja, Romania, at the mouth of the Sulina branch of the Danube. It is the easternmost point of Romania.

History
During the mid-Byzantine period, Sulina was a small cove, and in the 14th century, a Genoese port inhabited by a handful of sailors, pirates and fishermen. In the 18th century, the Ottomans built a lighthouse there in order to facilitate communication between Constantinople (Istanbul) and the Danubian Principalities, the main breadbaskets for the Ottoman capital.

Thanks to the signing of the Treaty of Adrianoupolis (Edirne) on September 2, 1829, that unfettered the Danube grain trade, Sulina, by then under Russian control, became an important port. Great sailing boats could not sail fully loaded to Brăila and Galați, which were the main export centres of Wallachia and Moldavia, because of the shallow waters of the river; therefore, they had to tranship at least part of their cargoes to smaller riverboats (shleps). The owners and crew of these shleps were almost always Greek.

Even greater development occurred after the signing of the Treaty of Paris (1856), which ended the Crimean War. One of the treaty's terms determined the establishment of the Danube European Committee(C.E.D.), which would conduct infrastructure works on the mouth of the river in order to make it floatable for larger ships as well. The technical works allowed entrance to the Danube for a great number of "foreign", i.e. non-Greek ships, leading to a higher level of competition. River faring, however, largely remained in Greek hands. The declaration by the Ottoman administration of Sulina as a free port in 1870 also boosted its development.

The Russo-Ottoman war of 1877–1878 led to many changes as well. The city was initially put under Russian control and after the signing of the Berlin Treaty was annexed to Romania, as was the whole Dobrudja area. According to a 1878 estimation, the town then had a total population of 800, consisting of 350 Greeks, 150 Turks, 50 Romanians, 50 Russian Old Believers and 200 others. During World War I the city served as base for the Romanian cruiser Elisabeta, whose actions kept the mouths of the Danube under Romanian control throughout the war.

In November 1916, the German submarine UC-15 was sent on a minelaying mission off Sulina and never returned, being sunk by her own mines. This was probably caused by an encounter with the Romanian torpedo boat Smeul, whose captain surprised a German submarine near Sulina in November 1916, the latter reportedly never returning to her base at Varna. This could only be UC-15, whose systems most likely malfunctioned after being forced to submerge in the shallow waters, upon encountering the Romanian torpedo boat.

In World War II, the Soviet M-class submarine M-59 was sunk by mines laid off Sulina by the Romanian minelayers Amiral Murgescu, Regele Carol I and Dacia.

Demographics

According to the 2011 census, 82.82% of the population were Romanians, 11.43% Lipovans, 1.8% Greeks, 1.29% Ukrainians and 2.3% of other or undeclared ethnicity. At the 2002 census, 93.0% spoke Romanian and 5.7% Russian as their first language. 94.3% were Orthodox and 5.1% Old Believers.

At the 1930 census, 47.2% were Romanians, 20.8% Greeks, 17.7% Lipovans, 3.3% Serbs, 3.0% Turks, 1.6% Jews, 1.0% Germans and 5.4% others.

Notable people 
 Romulus Bărbulescu (1925–2010), science-fiction writer
 Manya Botez (1896–1971), pianist and children's music teacher
 George Georgescu (1887–1964), conductor
 Vahan Malezian (1871–1966), writer, translator, poet, and social activist
 Ionel Petrov (born 1934), rower
 Ștefan Tarasov (born 1943), rower

Sightseeing
 The Lighthouse of the European Commission of the Danube
 The Church "Sf. Nicolae"
 The Cemetery

The waters of the Danube, which flow into the Black Sea, form the largest and best preserved of Europe's river deltas. The Danube delta hosts over 300 species of birds as well as 45 freshwater fish species in its numerous lakes and marshes.

Climate 
Sulina has a cold semi-arid climate (Köppen climate classification: BSk).

Gallery

References

Bibliography
Constantin Ardeleanu, International Trade and Diplomacy at the Lower Danube: The Sulina Question and the Economic Premises of the Crimean War (1829-185),  Editura Istros, 2014.

External links

 The Danube Delta Biosphere Reservation
 

Towns in Romania
Danube Delta
Populated places in Tulcea County
Localities in Northern Dobruja
Populated places on the Danube
Populated coastal places in Romania
Port cities and towns in Romania
Port cities of the Black Sea
Extreme points of Romania